Artery are a British post-punk band from Sheffield, that was founded in 1978. They were commonly known and often confused as 'The'. In 1985, they split up after several changes in the line-up and the release of a total of four albums. They reformed in 2007 after being invited by Jarvis Cocker to perform at the Meltdown Festival.

History
Artery evolved from earlier punk band named 'The' in 1978, with an original lineup of Mark Gouldthorpe (guitar), Toyce Ashley (vocals, guitar), Neil McKenzie (bass) and Garry Wilson (drums). After a self-financed single in 1979, the band released a second in 1980 on the Aardvark label, after which Mick Fidler (vocals, guitar, saxophone) was added. Two further singles followed in 1981, before Ashley left, with Gouldthorpe taking over on vocals and Simon Hinkler (formerly of TV Product) joining on keyboards and guitar. They received support from John Peel, for whom they recorded their first session for his BBC Radio 1 show in July 1981, recording a second early the following year. They signed to the Red Flame label in 1982, releasing a single and the Dale Griffin-produced mini-LP Oceans that year. Their track "Into the Garden" reached number nine in the 1982 Festive Fifty. They were often compared to Joy Division, although Gouldthorpe stated "We never listened to Joy Division – they were never an influence". Further lineup changes followed, with John White replacing Fidler, who was sacked for missing rehearsals, Christopher Hendrick replacing MacKenzie, and David Hinkler joining on keyboards. The band was reduced to a trio of Gouldthorpe, Wilson, and Hendrick by the time of the release of their second album, One Afternoon in a Hot Air Balloon (1983), with White leaving to form UV Pop and Simon Hinkler moving into production. Simon and David Hinkler and Garry Wilson all played in Pulp around 1983. In 1984 Hendrick left, with MacKenzie returning, and the band moved on to the Golden Dawn label, adding Murray Fenton to the lineup. A third album, The Second Coming, was released in 1984. Simon Hinkler briefly returned, with band manager Tony Perrin added on bass. A live album was released in 1985, by which time the band had split up, after Fenton had joined The Batfish Boys. 

Gouldthorpe and Simon Hinkler collaborated on a further album, Flight Commander Solitude & the Snake in 1986, and Hinkler went on to join The Mission. They collaborated on a second album, A Room Full of This, in 1992, working together under the name The Flight Commander.

A compilation of demos, live tracks and interviews, Afterwards, was released in 1985 on the Pleasantly Surprised label.

Gouldthorpe moved away from music to run his own hair salon, stating in 2009 "I lost it with music for a bit and went into dark corners".

The band reformed in 2007 after being invited to perform at the Meltdown Festival by long-time fan Jarvis Cocker, and recorded a session for Marc Riley's BBC 6 Music show. The band stayed together, releasing the Standing Still EP in 2009. In 2010 they decided to split up again after David Hinkler decided to leave, but continued after recruiting James Bacon to replace him. A new album, Civilisation, was released in October 2011.

Discography

Albums
 Oceans (1982), Red Flame
 One Afternoon in a Hot Air Balloon (1983), Red Flame - UK Indie No. 15
 The Second Coming (1984), Golden Dawn
 Number 4: Live in Amsterdam (1985), Golden Dawn
 Meltdown: Live 2007 (2007) - live album
 Civilisation (2011), Twin Speed

Compilations
 Afterwards: Recordings from 1979-1983 (1985), Pleasantly Surprised
 Into the Garden: An Artery Collection (2006), Cherry Red

Singles, EPs
"Mother Moon" (1979), Limited Edition
"Unbalanced" (1980), Aardvark - double-7-inch with a second live EP
"Cars in Motion" (1981), Aardvark
"Into the Garden" (1981), Armageddon
"The Clown" (1982), Red Flame
"Alabama Song" (1983), Red Flame
"A Big Machine" (1984), Golden Dawn
Diamonds in the Mine EP (1984), Golden Dawn
Standing Still EP (23 February 2009), Phantom Power

DVD
3 Days in June: the Reformation of Artery (2009), Sheffield Vision

References

External links

 Band biography by Simon Hinkler

English post-punk music groups
Musical groups from Sheffield
Musical groups established in 1978
Musical groups disestablished in 1985
Musical groups reestablished in 2007